"Bob Hope Takes Risks" is a song by the English post-punk band Rip Rig + Panic. It was released as a single on 27 November 1981.

Formats and track listing 
All lyrics by Gareth Sager, all music by Sean Oliver, Gareth Sager, Bruce Smith and Mark Springer.
UK 7" single (VS 468)
"Bob Hope Takes Risks" – 3:53
"Hey Mr E! A Gran Grin With a Shake of Smile" – 5:11

UK 12" single (VS 468(12))
"Bob Hope Takes Risks" – 7:01
"Hey Mr E! A Gran Grin With a Shake of Smile" – 5:11

Accolades

Personnel
Adapted from the Bob Hope Takes Risks liner notes.

Rip Rig + Panic
 Neneh Cherry – lead vocals
 Sean Oliver – bass guitar
 Gareth Sager – vocals, string arrangement, horn arrangement
 Bruce Smith – drums, percussion
 Mark Springer – piano

Additional musicians
 Woo Honeymoon – violin
 Debbie Holmes – cello
 Sarah Sarahandi – viola
 Alf Waite – trombone
 Dave "Flash" Wright – tenor saxophone
Production and additional personnel
 Dave Hunt – engineering
 Jill Mumford – design
 Rip Rig + Panic – production, design

Release history

References

External links 
 

1981 songs
1981 singles
Rip Rig + Panic songs
Virgin Records singles
Songs written by Sean Oliver
Songs written by Gareth Sager
Songs written by Bruce Smith (musician)
Songs written by Mark Springer (musician)